The Kazbegi Museum    is a museum in Kazbegi, (now Stepantsminda), Georgia.

References 

Museums in Georgia (country)
Buildings and structures in Mtskheta-Mtianeti
Tourist attractions in Mtskheta-Mtianeti